Peccati in famiglia  or Sins in the Family/Scandal in the Family  is a 1975 Italian erotic drama film directed by Bruno Gaburro. The film starred Michele Placido, Simonetta Stefanelli, Jenny Tamburi and acclaimed actor Renzo Montagnani.

Plot 

Carlo, an industrialist, arrives at his villa in Piacenza to spend the holidays with his wife Piera and his daughter Francesca. Upon arrival, he discovers that the cook - the attractive Zaira, who as a young boy he used to watch having sex and under whose covers he used to crawl during - has been replaced by Doris, a young and busty widow who he has not seen since she was a child. Carlo immediately begins to court and seduce her. After a few days Milo arrives from the South, the son of Carlo's incapable brother. He is a student, young and successful.

First, the boy conquers Francesca, who had an ambiguous relationship with her friend Fedora, then seduces Doris, whom he uses to move Uncle Carlo around, and finally Piera, who, more intelligent than her husband, is about to chase him from home.

After assuring himself of the complete dedication of the three women of the house, Milo pushes the uncle, who suffers from a heart condition, to an excessive effort with the cook, causing him a heart attack. In this way the boy from the South inherits the villa, the factories, and the women.

Cast
 Michele Placido: Milo
 Simonetta Stefanelli: Doris 
 Jenny Tamburi: Francesca 
 Juliette Mayniel: Piera  
 Renzo Montagnani: Carlo 
 Gastone Pescucci: Dr. Armando 
 Laura De Marchi: Vincenza 
 Corrado Olmi: Don Erminio 
 Edy Williams: Zaira

External links
 

1970s Italian-language films
1975 films
Italian erotic drama films
1970s erotic drama films
Films scored by Guido & Maurizio De Angelis
1975 drama films
Incest in film
Films directed by Bruno Gaburro
1970s Italian films